Bhakta Surdas is a 1942 Indian Hindi language film devotional film.
It was the third highest grossing Indian film of 1942. This was K. L. Saigal's first film after his move to Bombay from Calcutta. The film was directed by Chaturbhuj Doshi for Ranjit Studios. It had music by Gyan Dutt with lyrics by D. N. Madhok. Khursheed, after acting in several less popular films, finally became a big success with this film. The cast included K. L. Saigal, Khursheed, Monica Desai, Nagendra, M. Saigal and N. Desai.

Cast
 K. L. Saigal
 Khursheed
 Monica Desai
 Nagendra
 M. Saigal
 N. Desai
 Gharpure
 Kesarbai
 B. Sharma
 Bashir

Music
Considered as a high point in Saigal's singing career, the film had music by Gyan Dutt with lyrics by D. N. Madhok. His songs "Kadam Chale Aage, Man Pachhe Bhaage" and "Nainheen Ko Raah Dikha Prabhu" were big successes. "Madhukar Shyam Hamare Chor", "Panchhi Baawra, Chand Se Preet Lagaye", "Sar Par Kadam Ki Chhaiyan" (Raag Bhairavi) and "Maiya Mori Main Nahi Maakhan Khayo" are considered as  "Immortal bhajans"  as are several other "unforgettable songs" from the film.

Song List

References

External links
 

1942 films
1940s Hindi-language films
Indian biographical films
Films scored by Gyan Dutt
Indian black-and-white films
1940s biographical films
Films directed by Chaturbhuj Doshi